Salliann Beams (born 3 February 1984) is an English former cricketer who played over 100 times in limited overs cricket in England, primarily for Yorkshire. After retiring, she worked as part of the England women development programme, in connection with the under-19s, and also worked as the head coach at Loughborough University and Loughborough Lightning.

In March 2018, Briggs was named as the head coach for the WBBL Hobart Hurricanes and the WNCL Tasmanian Tigers. During her tenure at the Hurricanes, Briggs has coached the team to finish last (2018–19), second last (2019–20) and last (2020–21) on the WBBL ladder.

References

1984 births
Living people
Cricketers from Grimsby
Yorkshire women cricketers
English cricket coaches